Sir James Wright, 1st Baronet (baptised 1730 – 1804), of Ray House, Essex, was a British diplomat and art collector. He was the ambassador to Venice for Great Britain from 1766 to 1774.

Background 
He was the son of James Wright of Warwick (d. 1754) and Mary Huband (1700 – 1768). He is usually referred to as gentleman, but may have been an attorney at law by training or profession.

Wright's parents were married on 20 May 1728 in Ipsley, Worcester, England. He was baptised on 8 April 1730 at Warwick, St. Mary, Warwickshire, England. He had a brother, John (1729 –  probably died young), and two sisters, Mary (1734 – about 1807) and Jane (1736 – about 1765). His sister Mary Wright married Rice Charleton, an English physician, medical researcher, and Fellow of the Royal Society on 11 November 1759 at Walcot St. Swithin, Somerset, England. His sister Jane Wright married John Moore, Archbishop of Canterbury (26 April 1730 – 18 January 1805) on 29 April 1763 at Walcot St. Swithin, Somerset, England.

His father, James Wright of Warwick, purchased his wife's sisters' shares of the manor Hurstborne, and owned lands on Cubbington and Butlers Marston.

Huband family

His maternal grandparents were Sir John Huband, 2nd Baronet of Ipsley Court in Warwickshire and Rhoda, eldest daughter of Sir Thomas Broughton, Baronet of Broughton in the county of Stafford by Rhoda, daughter of John Amcotts of Aisthorpe in Lincolnshire, Esq. by Rhoda, daughter of Thomas Hussey of Caythorpe, eldest son of Sir Edward Hussey, 1st Baronet and Elizabeth Anton, daughter of George Anton of Lincoln, and Member of Parliament for Grantham, by Rhoda (d. 11 Oct. 1686), daughter and coheiress of Thomas Chapman, Draper of Soper Lane, London and Wormley, Hertfordshire, who married secondly as his second wife Ferdinando Fairfax, 2nd Lord Fairfax of Cameron.

His mother also had a sister named Rhoda, Dame Rhoda Delves alias Cotes.

First period in Italy, courtier
Wright and his wife Catherine first visited Venice in December 1758. An encounter there with Lady Mary Wortley Montagu led to an introduction to John Stuart, 3rd Earl of Bute and his wife Mary, daughter of Lady Mary.

The couple apparently had a close marriage. It was observed by Lady Mary, during the time in Venice the two of them comforted each other over the loss of their stillborn child. It put her in mind of the Butes, friends whose company she enjoyed: and Catherine Wright became her correspondent.

Wright was from that time on good terms with Lord Bute, who became Prime Minister in 1762, the relationship being described by William Bodham Donne as "private friend". Wright was a Groom of the Bedchamber to George III from 21 December 1762 to 30 May 1801. He was knighted on 3 July 1766.

Second period in Italy
Sir James Wright reached Venice as Resident in mid-September 1766. Shortly, by March 1767, Lord Northington, Lord Chancellor under successive Prime Ministers, showed a wish to exert nepotism on Wright's behalf: through his mother's sister Jane Huband, Wright was a nephew-by-marriage to Northington. Northington's demand, of priority for a move to Florence or Naples, disconcerted Horace Mann, Wright's friend who was settled at Florence. Wright tried to smooth matters over. Horace Walpole, Mann's correspondent, at the beginning of April was assuring Mann that he need not fear the intrigues of the "old drunken uncle" (Northington), given the influence of Mann's patron Henry Seymour Conway.

Both the Wrights were afflicted by illness while in Venice: and they spent a period in England, of around two years, from August 1769 to August 1771, during which Robert Richie deputised for Sir James.

Wright was created a Baronet on 12 October 1772 for his services as His Majesty's Resident at Venice. The Wrights left Venice in 1773, and the posting officially terminated in 1774. John Udny (1727–1800), brother of Robert Udny, filled in for Wright, until his successor John Strange arrived.

Later life in politics
In 1778, Wright became involved in a political furore  when he and Dr. Addington, his own and Chatham's physician, engaged in a futile attempt to bring about a political alliance between Bute and Chatham. This incident terminated the friendship with Bute.

Residence, collection and estates
In about 1770 Wright bought Ray House in Woodford from Bennet Hannot. He later took up residence in the two-storey five-bay brick mansion. Around 1773–6 Robert Adam worked on Ray House for Wright. Here Wright housed a collection of paintings acquired in his time in Venice. He was an art dealer, and made exaggerated claims for the works: a painting now attributed to Palma Vecchio was described by him as a Giorgione. He purchased amongst other works The Finding of Moses by Giambattista Tiepolo (as a Benedetto Caliari) in 1769, on behalf of Lord Bute. The painting of the biblical story is now in the National Gallery of Scotland.

His time in Venice had allowed Wright some opportunity to develop as a connoisseur of painting, and he became a patron. He commissioned portraits: from Robert Fagan, Matthew William Peters, Joshua Reynolds, and Johann Zoffany. In the heated crayon debate of British art in the late 18th century, he contributed an opinion. Joseph Farington recorded in 1796 that at a Royal Academy committee meeting:

A letter was read from Sir James Wright stating that 'having observed how much Crayon painting is fallen off in what he sees at the Exhibitions'. He offers the Academy a portrait by F. Cotes of Bromfield, the surgeon, as a lesson to the Students.

Wright founded an artificial slate business on his estate in Woodford, noticed in Environs of London by Daniel Lysons, and mentioned by John Hassell as in a building using such slates. The product was publicised in an anonymous pamphlet of the 1780s, particularly directed towards export to the West Indies. In 1776 Wright went into the business as proprietor by purchasing a patent, from Henry Cook of Norfolk. He refined on the manufacturing process by importing ideas from Italy. Wright also acquired several adjacent estates, including Monkham house and farm.

Family
James Wright, then of Warwick, was married to Catherine Stapleton (1732–1802), only daughter of Sir William Stapleton, 4th Baronet, on 9 December 1754 at St George's Hanover Square Church, London. The wedding was officiated by Abraham Joseph Rudd, Curate of St. George, Hanover. The witnesses were Sir James Wright's maternal aunt Rhoda Cotes and her third husband William Maddott.

The Stapletons were slave-owning proprietors of West Indian sugar plantations, and Sir William had died in 1740. A complex legal situation arose after the death in 1746 of his mother, Lady Frances. It was resolved in 1760–1, with Wright receiving a one-eighth share in West Indian property. A corresponding share in the Fountain (Stapletons) estate on St Kitts remained in the Wright family until 1840, when it was sold to Stapleton Cotton, 1st Viscount Combermere. In the period from 1776, the Fountains estate was in practice managed, from England, by Catherine Stapleton (1733–1815), first cousin to Catherine Wright, and close friend of Hester Pitt, Countess of Chatham.

In 1788 Wright gave away the bride at the second marriage of Thomas Haweis. She was Jennett Payne Orton, otherwise known as Miss Orton and Janet Payne Orton, a close associate of Selina, Countess of Huntingdon. She is described as the niece of Sir Gillies Payne, 2nd Baronet, of Tempsford Hall, a connection to St Kitts where Payne owned two estates. The acquaintance with Haweis in 1791 drew Wright into unsuccessful negotiations on episcopal ordination of some missionaries hoping to sail on the Second Breadfruit Voyage of William Bligh to Tahiti, with John Moore, now Archbishop of Canterbury.

Third period in Italy
The Wrights spent further time in Italy during the 1790s. Their son George, an invalid, was there with his tutor, John Ireland, before the latter took up the living of Croydon in 1793.

Lady Wright travelled to Italy in 1790, with her son, and Maria Cosway with her brother George Hadfield. Later Sir James came out, with Ireland; and bought more pictures on the trip.

Sir George Wright, 2nd Baronet

Their son George Ernest James Wright was baptised on 8 April 1770 at Walcot St. Swithin, Somerset, England. Sir James's sister Mary Charleton was his godmother. He married Rebecca Maclane (1772 – 10 January1819) of Ham, Surrey, on 3 June 1796 at St. Mary, Lambeth, Surrey, England. Officiating at the ceremony was his uncle-by-marriage, John Moore, Archbishop of Canterbury, the widower of his aunt, Jane.

At the time of the wedding, the papers reported that Rebecca Maclane was the 'only daughter and heiress to Charles Maclane of Okingham in Berkshire' (Wokingham, in Victorian times the name became corrupted to Oakingham). Far more likely, as other sources note, she was the daughter of Duncan Maclane (d.1773) of the East India Company, gentleman, of Saint John, Hackney, Middlesex, and his wife Rebecca Brandey (d.1792) of Clapham, Surrey at the time she wrote her will. That would make her the Rebecca Maclane that was registered 2 September 1772 in a non-conformist and non-parochial register, born 3 August 1772, the daughter of Duncan Maclane and Rebecca, daughter of Joseph Bradney. A John Bradney was a witness at the wedding of George Wright and Rebecca Maclane.

The couple first had one child, Ruperta Maria Wright, born on 21 August 1798, baptised on 1 September 1798 at Saint Mary, St. Marylebone in London, and died on 8 September 1798, buried at St. Marylebone, Westminster, England. Their only surviving child, Ruperta Catherine, married Edward Murray (5 November 1798 – 1 July 1852), Vicar of Northolt, Middlesex, the second son of the Reverend Lord George Murray, Bishop of St. David's, and nephew of the Duke of Atholl, on 14 February 1822.

Ray Lodge
Wright built Ray Lodge, near Ray House, for George, employing from 1793 as architect John Buonarotti Papworth.

Aftermath
Lady Wright died at Bath on 6 January 1802. The Wrights had then been living in Bath for some time. Sir James died at Bathford on 8 March 1804. His will was proven on 17 March 1804.

In 1807, Sir George Wright sold his Ray House estate to Benjamin Hanson Inglish. On Sir George's death, in or before 1812, the baronetcy became extinct (or technically dormant), and the slate business closed down , while a stone-cutting business for pipes in Dublin managed by George Papworth for Sir George, from 1806, lasted to 1812. Ray House was destroyed by fire in 1838.

References 

1730 births
Year of birth uncertain
1804 deaths
Ambassadors of Great Britain to the Republic of Venice
Baronets in the Baronetage of Great Britain
People from Warwick
People from Essex